Vranješ may refer to:

 Jurica Vranješ (born 1980), Croatian footballer
 Ljubomir Vranjes (born 1973), Swedish handball player of Serbian origin
 Mićo Vranješ (born 1975), Serbian footballer
 Ognjen Vranješ (born 1989), Bosnian footballer
 Stjepan Vranješ (born 1971), Croatian footballer
 Stojan Vranješ (born 1986), Bosnian footballer
 Vladimir Vranješ (born 1988), Bosnian handball player

See also
 Vraneš

Serbian surnames
Croatian surnames